Cosmopterix latilineata is a moth of the family Cosmopterigidae. It is known from Thailand and the Philippines.

References

latilineata
Moths of Asia
Moths of the Philippines